Anton Reisenegger von Oepen (born 21 January 1969) is a Chilean musician who is the lead guitarist and vocalist of the thrash/death metal band Criminal. He is also the host of the extreme metal radio show Disco Duro on Radio Futuro.

At the age of 16, Reisenegger was involved in the gestation of a new musical movement within Chile, heavy metal. He began to play with friends to form one of the main bands of the underground world: Pentagram Chile.

Career

Pentagram (1985–1992, 2007–present) 
Pentagram was the first band in which Reisenegger performed as voice, guitar, and frontman. The group debuted on 28 December 1985, with the following lineup: Reisenegger (vocals and lead guitar), Juan Pablo Uribe (guitar), and Eduardo Topelberg (drums).

By 1987, the band recorded a demo (Demo I) in which Reisenegger improvised on bass guitar. Due to limited media coverage of the genre at the time, it was left for the fans to spread the albums of different bands. This was primarily accomplished by simply exchanging cassettes among fans and followers. This marketing method made Demo I quite popular within the extreme metal underground scene.

In September of that year, Pentagram released their second demo, called Demo II, which was well received. Thanks to internal distribution, the band was able to record a single in Switzerland, through the Chainsaw Murder Records label.

The loss of motivation of the group came from the national and international labels' disinterest in their music, which led to decreases in the quality and ingenuity of the music. All this, plus the immaturity of the members, led to the separation of the group.

Pentagram said goodbye to their public in 1988 at the Plaza Manuel Rodríguez before a crowd of 2,000 people.

On 27 May 2001, a packed Caupolicán theater witnessed the return of Pentagram to the stage, this time with both old and new fans.

Fallout (1989) 
Fallout was a fairly short-lived project, Reisenegger only lasted a year in the group and then withdrew. The style was more influenced by thrash and power metal, unlike his previous band that was clearly death metal.

They released two demos, which did not seem to gain much support.

Yet despite the limited success of the project, this was the beginnings of what would be his most ambitious and well-known product: Criminal.

Lock Up (2006–present) 
On 23 July 2006, Reisenegger was introduced as the new guitarist of the deathgrind project with Shane Embury, Nicholas Barker, and Tomas Lindberg, Lock Up.

Criminal (1991–present) 
Criminal has been seen as the project in which the best of Reisenegger's ideas have been channeled and in which his musical journey has flourished. Criminal began in 1991 under the command of Reisenegger and Rodrigo Contreras, who were later joined by JJ Vallejo and Francisco "Cato" Cueto.

In 2000, due to many of the same difficulties that led to the breakdown of Pentagram, Reisenegger relocated to England. There he met the vocalist for Extreme Noise Terror, who offered the Chilean a position as the replacement for an absent guitarist for a tour. In this way, Reisenegger met Zac O'Neil, the drummer for Extreme Noise Terror, who manifested his willingness to explore other musical directions, including the possibility of working with Reisenegger. The latter did not hesitate to show O'neil his work from Criminal, which only served to further convince the drummer.

The Chilean joined O'neil on a projected already being planned (Cradle of Filth) with Rob Eaglestone and Mark Rogue of Entwined. The style was Thrash Metal with industrial trends, a combination which served to motivated Reisenegger's return to Criminal. He reached out to Rodrigo Contreras and began recording Cancer, first international project and with a new lineup.

Since then, Criminal has been based between England and Spain. The band has been very well received by the public, and has performed in various concerts. Tours of Europe and sporadic visits to Chile have been the trend in recent years, each year gaining more followers and establishing notoriety.

United Forces (2012–present) 
On 24 December 2012, it was announced that Reisenegger would become the guitarist of the United States-based heavy metal band United Forces, which features two former members of Stormtroopers of Death, vocalist Billy Milano and bassist Dan Lilker, and Nick Barker on drums.

Discography

Pentagram 
 Demo I (1987)
 Demo II (1987)
 Pentagram (2004)
 Fatal Prediction/Demoniac Possession (1987)
 Under The Spell of the Pentagram (2008)
 The Malefice (2013)

Fallout 
 Demo I (1989)
 Demo II (1989)

Lock Up 
 Necropolis Transparent (2011)
 Demonization  (2017)

Criminal 
 Demo (1992)
 Forked Demo (1992)
 Victimized (1994)
 Live Disorder (1996)
 Dead Soul (1997)
 Slave Masters (1998)
 Cancer (2000)
 No Gods No Masters (2004)
 Sicario (2005)
 White Hell (2009)
 Akelarre (2011)
 Fear Itself (2016)

References

Living people
Chilean heavy metal singers
21st-century Chilean male singers
Chilean people of German descent
1969 births
Chilean heavy metal musicians
Lock Up (British band) members
20th-century Chilean male singers
20th-century Chilean male artists